Yaovi Prosper Adodo (born 12 June 1942) is a former Togolese diplomat and politician. Adodo was the Minister of Foreign Affairs from 1987 to 1991 under President Gnassingbé Eyadéma. Additionally he served as Minister of Finance from 1988 to 1990. He was previously Minister of Planning and Industry, in which capacity he signed the Third ACP-EEC Convention in Lomé on 8 December 1984.

Adodo was appointed as one of six members of the Commission of the West African Economic and Monetary Union (UEMOA) on 30 January 1995.

References

1942 births
Living people
Togolese diplomats
Government ministers of Togo
Foreign ministers of Togo
Finance ministers of Togo
21st-century Togolese people